George Bacon Wood (March 13, 1797 – March 30, 1879) was an American physician, professor, and writer from Pennsylvania.

A native of Greenwich, New Jersey, Wood was educated at the University of Pennsylvania, from which he received his medical degree in 1818. Four years later he became professor of chemistry in the Philadelphia College of Pharmacy, and in 1821 took the chair of materia medica in the same institution, which he resigned in 1835 to accept the same branch in the medical department of the University of Pennsylvania. In 1850, having been continuously connected with the latter institution in the position mentioned, he was elected professor of the theory and practice of medicine in the same school, and upon his resigning, in 1860, he was unanimously appointed emeritus professor of the theory and practice of medicine. In 1863 he was made a member of the board of trustees of the university, and in 1865 he instituted and endowed the summer school with an auxiliary faculty, authorized to confer the degree of doctor of philosophy.

He was physician to the Pennsylvania Hospital for twenty-four years (1835–59), and was a member of the faculty of the University of Pennsylvania for about the same period. At the time of his death he was president of the College of Physicians of Philadelphia, and president of the American Philosophical Society (elected in 1829). He was a member of a number of other societies, and had been president of the American Medical Association. During the last four years he had been an invalid and confined to his house, the last two years being unable to leave his couch.  He is buried in the South segment (Section 10, Lot 14 to 17) of Laurel Hill Cemetery, Philadelphia.

Wood contributed frequently to medical literature, but his reputation as a writer is chiefly based upon his Treatise on Practice, published in 1847, which ran through six editions, the last being in 1867. Previous to this work, however, he had, with the Dr. Franklin Bache, compiled the Dispensatory of the United States, which first appeared in 1833. He also wrote a Treatise on Therapeutics and Pharmacology or Materia Medica (Philadelphia, 1856), and a number of addresses, including a short History of the Pennsylvania Hospital and one of the University of Pennsylvania.

Wood's nephew Horatio C Wood also became a noted physician.

References

External links

 
 

1797 births
1879 deaths
Burials at Laurel Hill Cemetery (Philadelphia)
Physicians from Pennsylvania
University of Pennsylvania faculty
People from Greenwich Township, Cumberland County, New Jersey
Presidents of the American Medical Association
Perelman School of Medicine at the University of Pennsylvania alumni